Ross Taylor (8 May 1938 – 7 December 1996) was an Australian cricketer. He played one first-class match for New South Wales in 1959/60. He was married to Helen Lee, who played Women's Test cricket for Australia.

See also
 List of New South Wales representative cricketers

References

External links
 

1938 births
1996 deaths
Australian cricketers
New South Wales cricketers
People from Tamworth, New South Wales
Cricketers from New South Wales